The Canon de 85 modèle 1927 Schneider was a field gun used by Greece during World War II. After the occupation of Greece, the Germans allotted this gun the designation of 8.5 cm Kanonehaubitze 287(g), but it is unknown if they actually used them themselves.

It appears to have been the inspiration for the Japanese 75 mm Type 90 Field Gun. After the Versailles Treaty, the Japanese switched to the French Schneider company, and purchased numerous examples for test and evaluation. With an Army rearmament program starting in 1931, a new 75 mm field gun loosely based on the Canon de 85 modèle 1927 Schneider was introduced, known as the Type 90 75 mm Field Gun.

References

 Chamberlain, Peter & Gander, Terry (1975). Light and Medium Field Artillery. New York: Arco.

World War II artillery of Greece
World War II field artillery
85 mm artillery
Schneider Electric